Rosely Roth (August 21, 1959 in São Paulo, São Paulo, Brazil – August 28, 1990 in São Paulo, São Paulo, Brazil) is considered one of the pioneers in the history of the LGBT movement of Brazil (known in Portuguese as the Movimento Homosexual Brasileiro).

Biography

Early life and education
The daughter of Jewish parents, she attended both Jewish and non-Jewish schools while growing up in her native São Paulo. In 1981, she obtained a degree in Philosophy from the Pontifícia Universidade Católica de São Paulo; and in 1985-1986 she graduated again from the same university with a degree in Anthropology, having dedicated her studies on lesbian life and sexuality in São Paulo.

Women's movement
Roth started her direct participation in the women's movement at the beginning of 1981 by attending meetings at the Grupo Lésbico Feminista (1979–1990) and at the SOS Mulher (1980–1993). In addition, in 1981 Roth and Míriam Martinho, another pioneer of the Brazilian LGBT movement, founded the Grupo Ação Lésbica-Feminista - GALF (1981–1990) in São Paulo.

Roth was involved in many organizations and activities demanding sexual freedom and equal rights for lesbians and all members of the LGBT community during most of her adult life. She was particularly active in bringing visibility to related issues in the local and national media when the LGBT movement was still in its infancy in Brazil.

Death
In the last phase of Roth's life, she started to suffer from what has been described as deep emotional problems. As a consequence, it is believed that her health condition led her to commit suicide.

The Dia Nacional do Orgulho Lésbico, a national day of lesbian pride, celebrated annually throughout Brazil on August 19, since 2003, has been established in her honor.

References

External links 
 O Movimento Homossexual Brasileiro... by Michele Cunha Franco Conde (In Portuguese).
 Um outro olhar: Rosely Roth  by Miriam Martinho (In Portuguese).
 
 BRASINE: Brasileiras que fizeram historia by Mídia Brasileira para a Alemanha, Áustria e Suíça/Brasilianische Medien für Deutschland, Österreich und Schweiz (In Portuguese and German).

1959 births
1990 deaths
Brazilian feminists
Brazilian Jews
Lesbian Jews
Brazilian lesbians
Brazilian LGBT rights activists
Lesbian feminists
People from São Paulo
1990 suicides
20th-century Brazilian LGBT people